John Adolphus Beckwith (1 December 1800 – 23 November 1880) was a Canadian politician.

Born in Fredericton, New Brunswick, one of six children of Nehemiah Beckwith and Julie-Louise, Beckwith was a professional surveyor and engineer. He was mayor of Fredericton in 1863 and 1864. He was elected to the Legislative Assembly of New Brunswick in 1866. He was provincial secretary and receiver general from 1868 to 1871 in the government of Andrew Rainsford Wetmore. In 1874, he was appointed to the Legislative Council of New Brunswick.

References
 

1800 births
1880 deaths
Mayors of Fredericton
Progressive Conservative Party of New Brunswick MLAs
Politicians from Fredericton
Conservative Party of New Brunswick MLCs
Provincial Secretaries of New Brunswick
Colony of New Brunswick people